Macedonia, also called Macedon, was an ancient kingdom on the periphery of Archaic and Classical Greece, and later the dominant state of Hellenistic Greece. The kingdom was founded and initially ruled by the royal Argead dynasty, which was followed by the Antipatrid and Antigonid dynasties. Home to the ancient Macedonians, the earliest kingdom was centered on the northeastern part of the Greek peninsula, and bordered by Epirus to the west, Paeonia to the north, Thrace to the east and Thessaly to the south.

Before the 4th century BC, Macedonia was a small kingdom outside of the area dominated by the great city-states of Athens, Sparta and Thebes, and briefly subordinate to Achaemenid Persia. During the reign of the Argead king PhilipII (359–336 BC), Macedonia subdued mainland Greece and the Thracian Odrysian kingdom through conquest and diplomacy. With a reformed army containing phalanxes wielding the sarissa pike, PhilipII defeated the old powers of Athens and Thebes in the Battle of Chaeronea in 338BC. PhilipII's son Alexander the Great, leading a federation of Greek states, accomplished his father's objective of commanding the whole of Greece when he destroyed Thebes after the city revolted. During Alexander's subsequent campaign of conquest, he overthrew the Achaemenid Empire and conquered territory that stretched as far as the Indus River. For a brief period, his Macedonian Empire was the most powerful in the world – the definitive Hellenistic state, inaugurating the transition to a new period of Ancient Greek civilization. Greek arts and literature flourished in the new conquered lands and advances in philosophy, engineering, and science spread throughout much of the ancient world. Of particular importance were the contributions of Aristotle, tutor to Alexander, whose writings became a keystone of Western philosophy.

After Alexander's death in 323BC, the ensuing wars of the Diadochi, and the partitioning of Alexander's short-lived empire, Macedonia remained a Greek cultural and political center in the Mediterranean region along with Ptolemaic Egypt, the Seleucid Empire, and the Kingdom of Pergamon. Important cities such as Pella, Pydna, and Amphipolis were involved in power struggles for control of the territory. New cities were founded, such as Thessalonica by the usurper Cassander (named after his wife Thessalonike of Macedon). Macedonia's decline began with the Macedonian Wars and the rise of Rome as the leading Mediterranean power. At the end of the Third Macedonian War in 168BC, the Macedonian monarchy was abolished and replaced by Roman client states. A short-lived revival of the monarchy during the Fourth Macedonian War in 150–148BC ended with the establishment of the Roman province of Macedonia.

The Macedonian kings, who wielded absolute power and commanded state resources such as gold and silver, facilitated mining operations to mint currency, finance their armies and, by the reign of PhilipII, a Macedonian navy. Unlike the other diadochi successor states, the imperial cult fostered by Alexander was never adopted in Macedonia, yet Macedonian rulers nevertheless assumed roles as high priests of the kingdom and leading patrons of domestic and international cults of the Hellenistic religion. The authority of Macedonian kings was theoretically limited by the institution of the army, while a few municipalities within the Macedonian commonwealth enjoyed a high degree of autonomy and even had democratic governments with popular assemblies.

Etymology

The name Macedonia comes from the ethnonym , which itself is derived from the ancient Greek adjective μακεδνός, meaning "tall, slim", also the name of a people related to the Dorians (Herodotus), and possibly descriptive of Ancient Macedonians. It is most likely cognate with the adjective , meaning "long" or "tall" in Ancient Greek. The name is believed to have originally meant either "highlanders", "the tall ones", or "high grown men". Linguist Robert S. P. Beekes claims that both terms are of Pre-Greek substrate origin and cannot be explained in terms of Indo-European morphology, however Filip De Decker rejects Beekesʼ arguments as insufficient.

History

Early history and legend

The Classical Greek historians Herodotus and Thucydides reported the legend that the Macedonian kings of the Argead dynasty were descendants of Temenus, king of Argos, and could therefore claim the mythical Heracles as one of their ancestors as well as a direct lineage from Zeus, chief god of the Greek pantheon. Contradictory legends state that either Perdiccas I of Macedon or Caranus of Macedon were the founders of the Argead dynasty, with either five or eight kings before AmyntasI. The assertion that the Argeads descended from Temenus was accepted by the Hellanodikai authorities of the Ancient Olympic Games, permitting Alexander I of Macedon to enter the competitions owing to his perceived Greek heritage. Little is known about the kingdom before the reign of AlexanderI's father Amyntas I of Macedon during the Archaic period.

The kingdom of Macedonia was situated along the Haliacmon and Axius rivers in Lower Macedonia, north of Mount Olympus. Historian Robert Malcolm Errington suggests that one of the earliest Argead kings established Aigai (modern Vergina) as their capital in the mid-7th centuryBC. Before the 4th centuryBC, the kingdom covered a region corresponding roughly to the western and central parts of the region of Macedonia in modern Greece. It gradually expanded into the region of Upper Macedonia, inhabited by the Greek Lyncestae and Elimiotae tribes, and into regions of Emathia, Eordaia, Bottiaea, Mygdonia, Crestonia, and Almopia, which were inhabited by various peoples such as Thracians and Phrygians. Macedonia's non-Greek neighbors included Thracians, inhabiting territories to the northeast, Illyrians to the northwest, and Paeonians to the north, while the lands of Thessaly to the south and Epirus to the west were inhabited by Greeks with similar cultures to that of the Macedonians.

A year after Darius I of Persia launched an invasion into Europe against the Scythians, Paeonians, Thracians, and several Greek city-states of the Balkans, the Persian general Megabazus used diplomacy to convince AmyntasI to submit as a vassal of the Achaemenid Empire, ushering in the period of Achaemenid Macedonia. Achaemenid Persian hegemony over Macedonia was briefly interrupted by the Ionian Revolt (499–493BC), yet the Persian general Mardonius brought it back under Achaemenid suzerainty.

Although Macedonia enjoyed a large degree of autonomy and was never made a satrapy (i.e. province) of the Achaemenid Empire, it was expected to provide troops for the Achaemenid army. AlexanderI provided Macedonian military support to Xerxes I during the Second Persian invasion of Greece in 480–479 BC, and Macedonian soldiers fought on the side of the Persians at the 479BC Battle of Platea. Following the Greek victory at Salamis in 480BC, AlexanderI was employed as an Achaemenid diplomat to propose a peace treaty and alliance with Athens, an offer that was rejected. Soon afterwards, the Achaemenid forces were forced to withdraw from mainland Europe, marking the end of Persian control over Macedonia.

Involvement in the Classical Greek world

Although initially a Persian vassal, AlexanderI of Macedon fostered friendly diplomatic relations with his former Greek enemies, the Athenian and Spartan-led coalition of Greek city-states. His successor PerdiccasII led the Macedonians to war in four separate conflicts against Athens, leader of the Delian League, while incursions by the Thracian ruler Sitalces of the Odrysian kingdom threatened Macedonia's territorial integrity in the northeast. The Athenian statesman Pericles promoted colonization of the Strymon River near the Kingdom of Macedonia, where the colonial city of Amphipolis was founded in 437/436BC so that it could provide Athens with a steady supply of silver and gold as well as timber and pitch to support the Athenian navy. Initially Perdiccas II did not take any action and might have even welcomed the Athenians, as the Thracians were foes to both of them. This changed due to an Athenian alliance with a brother and cousin of PerdiccasII who had rebelled against him. Thus, two separate wars were fought against Athens between 433 and 431BC. The Macedonian king retaliated by promoting the rebellion of Athens' allies in Chalcidice and subsequently won over the strategic city of Potidaea. After capturing the Macedonian cities Therma and Beroea, Athens besieged Potidaea but failed to overcome it; Therma was returned to Macedonia and much of Chalcidice to Athens in a peace treaty brokered by Sitalces, who provided Athens with military aid in exchange for acquiring new Thracian allies.

PerdiccasII sided with Sparta in the Peloponnesian War (431–404 BC) between Athens and Sparta, and in 429 BC Athens retaliated by persuading Sitalces to invade Macedonia, but he was forced to retreat owing to a shortage of provisions in winter. In 424 BC, Arrhabaeus, a local ruler of Lynkestis in Upper Macedonia, rebelled against his overlord Perdiccas, and the Spartans agreed to help in putting down the revolt. At the Battle of Lyncestis the Macedonians panicked and fled before the fighting began, enraging the Spartan general Brasidas, whose soldiers looted the unattended Macedonian baggage train. Perdiccas then changed sides and supported Athens, and he was able to put down Arrhabaeus's revolt.

Brasidas died in 422 BC, the year Athens and Sparta struck an accord, the Peace of Nicias, that freed Macedonia from its obligations as an Athenian ally. Following the 418BC Battle of Mantinea, the victorious Spartans formed an alliance with Argos, a military pact PerdiccasII was keen to join given the threat of Spartan allies remaining in Chalcidice. When Argos suddenly switched sides as a pro-Athenian democracy, the Athenian navy was able to form a blockade against Macedonian seaports and invade Chalcidice in 417BC. PerdiccasII sued for peace in 414BC, forming an alliance with Athens that was continued by his son and successor ArchelausI. Athens then provided naval support to ArchelausI in the 410BC Macedonian siege of Pydna, in exchange for timber and naval equipment.

Although Archelaus I was faced with some internal revolts and had to fend off an invasion of Illyrians led by Sirras of Lynkestis, he was able to project Macedonian power into Thessaly where he sent military aid to his allies. Although he retained Aigai as a ceremonial and religious center, ArchelausI moved the capital of the kingdom north to Pella, which was then positioned by a lake with a river connecting it to the Aegean Sea. He improved Macedonia's currency by minting coins with a higher silver content as well as issuing separate copper coinage. His royal court attracted the presence of well-known intellectuals such as the Athenian playwright Euripides. When ArchelausI was assassinated (perhaps following a homosexual love affair with royal pages at his court), the kingdom was plunged into chaos, in an era lasting from 399 to 393BC that included the reign of four different monarchs: Orestes, son of ArchelausI; AeropusII, uncle, regent, and murderer of Orestes; Pausanias, son of AeropusII; and AmyntasII, who was married to the youngest daughter of ArchelausI. Very little is known about this turbulent period; it came to an end when AmyntasIII, son of Arrhidaeus and grandson of AmyntasI, killed Pausanias and claimed the Macedonian throne.

Amyntas III was forced to flee his kingdom in either 393 or 383BC (based on conflicting accounts), owing to a massive invasion by the Illyrians led by Bardylis. The pretender to the throne Argaeus ruled in his absence, yet AmyntasIII eventually returned to his kingdom with the aid of Thessalian allies. AmyntasIII was also nearly overthrown by the forces of the Chalcidian city of Olynthos, but with the aid of Teleutias, brother of the Spartan king Agesilaus II, the Macedonians forced Olynthos to surrender and dissolve their Chalcidian League in 379BC.

Alexander II, son of EurydiceI and AmyntasIII, succeeded his father and immediately invaded Thessaly to wage war against the tagus (supreme Thessalian military leader) Alexander of Pherae, capturing the city of Larissa. The Thessalians, desiring to remove both AlexanderII and Alexander of Pherae as their overlords, appealed to Pelopidas of Thebes for aid; he succeeded in recapturing Larissa and, in the peace agreement arranged with Macedonia, received aristocratic hostages including AlexanderII's brother and future king PhilipII. When Alexander was assassinated by his brother-in-law Ptolemy of Aloros, the latter acted as an overbearing regent for PerdiccasIII, younger brother of AlexanderII, who eventually had Ptolemy executed when reaching the age of majority in 365BC. The remainder of Perdiccas III's reign was marked by political stability and financial recovery. However, an Athenian invasion led by Timotheus, son of Conon, managed to capture Methone and Pydna, and an Illyrian invasion led by Bardylis succeeded in killing PerdiccasIII and 4,000 Macedonian troops in battle.

Rise of Macedon

Philip II was twenty-four years old when he acceded to the throne in 359BC. Through the use of deft diplomacy, he was able to convince the Thracians under Berisades to cease their support of Pausanias, a pretender to the throne, and the Athenians to halt their support of another pretender. He achieved these by bribing the Thracians and their Paeonian allies and establishing a treaty with Athens that relinquished his claims to Amphipolis. He was also able to make peace with the Illyrians who had threatened his borders.

Philip II spent his initial years radically transforming the Macedonian army. A reform of its organization, equipment, and training, including the introduction of the Macedonian phalanx armed with long pikes (i.e. the sarissa), proved immediately successful when tested against his Illyrian and Paeonian enemies. Confusing accounts in ancient sources have led modern scholars to debate how much PhilipII's royal predecessors may have contributed to these reforms and the extent to which his ideas were influenced by his adolescent years of captivity in Thebes as a political hostage during the Theban hegemony, especially after meeting with the general Epaminondas.

The Macedonians, like the other Greeks, traditionally practiced monogamy, but PhilipII practiced polygamy and married seven wives with perhaps only one that did not involve the loyalty of his aristocratic subjects or new allies. His first marriages were to Phila of Elimeia of the Upper Macedonian aristocracy as well as the Illyrian princess Audata to ensure a marriage alliance. To establish an alliance with Larissa in Thessaly, he married the Thessalian noblewoman Philinna in 358BC, who bore him a son who would later rule as Philip III Arrhidaeus. In 357BC, he married Olympias to secure an alliance with Arybbas, the King of Epirus and the Molossians. This marriage would bear a son who would later rule as AlexanderIII (better known as Alexander the Great) and claim descent from the legendary Achilles by way of his dynastic heritage from Epirus. It is unclear whether or not the Achaemenid Persian kings influenced PhilipII's practice of polygamy, although his predecessor AmyntasIII had three sons with a possible second wife Gygaea: Archelaus, Arrhidaeus, and Menelaus. PhilipII had Archelaus put to death in 359BC, while PhilipII's other two half brothers fled to Olynthos, serving as a casus belli for the Olynthian War (349–348BC) against the Chalcidian League.

While Athens was preoccupied with the Social War (357–355 BC), PhilipII retook Amphipolis from them in 357BC and the following year recaptured Pydna and Potidaea, the latter of which he handed over to the Chalcidian League as promised in a treaty. In 356BC, he took Crenides, refounding it as Philippi, while his general Parmenion defeated the Illyrian king Grabos II of the Grabaei. During the 355–354BC siege of Methone, PhilipII lost his right eye to an arrow wound, but managed to capture the city and treated the inhabitants cordially, unlike the Potidaeans, who had been enslaved.

Philip II then involved Macedonia in the Third Sacred War (356–346BC). It began when Phocis captured and plundered the temple of Apollo at Delphi instead of submitting unpaid fines, causing the Amphictyonic League to declare war on Phocis and a civil war among the members of the Thessalian League aligned with either Phocis or Thebes. PhilipII's initial campaign against Pherae in Thessaly in 353BC at the behest of Larissa ended in two disastrous defeats by the Phocian general Onomarchus. PhilipII in turn defeated Onomarchus in 352BC at the Battle of Crocus Field, which led to PhilipII's election as leader (archon) of the Thessalian League, provided him a seat on the Amphictyonic Council, and allowed for a marriage alliance with Pherae by wedding Nicesipolis, niece of the tyrant Jason of Pherae.

Philip II had some early involvement with the Achaemenid Empire, especially by supporting satraps and mercenaries who rebelled against the central authority of the Achaemenid king. The satrap of Hellespontine Phrygia Artabazos II, who was in rebellion against Artaxerxes III, was able to take refuge as an exile at the Macedonian court from 352 to 342 BC. He was accompanied in exile by his family and by his mercenary general Memnon of Rhodes. Barsine, daughter of Artabazos, and future wife of Alexander the Great, grew up at the Macedonian court.

After campaigning against the Thracian ruler Cersobleptes, in 349BC, PhilipII began his war against the Chalcidian League, which had been reestablished in 375BC following a temporary disbandment. Despite an Athenian intervention by Charidemus, Olynthos was captured by PhilipII in 348BC, and its inhabitants were sold into slavery, including some Athenian citizens. The Athenians, especially in a series of speeches by Demosthenes known as the Olynthiacs, were unsuccessful in persuading their allies to counterattack and in 346BC concluded a treaty with Macedonia known as the Peace of Philocrates. The treaty stipulated that Athens would relinquish claims to Macedonian coastal territories, the Chalcidice, and Amphipolis in return for the release of the enslaved Athenians as well as guarantees that PhilipII would not attack Athenian settlements in the Thracian Chersonese. Meanwhile, Phocis and Thermopylae were captured by Macedonian forces, the Delphic temple robbers were executed, and PhilipII was awarded the two Phocian seats on the Amphictyonic Council and the position of master of ceremonies over the Pythian Games. Athens initially opposed his membership on the council and refused to attend the games in protest, but they eventually accepted these conditions, perhaps after some persuasion by Demosthenes in his oration On the Peace.

Over the next few years, Philip II reformed local governments in Thessaly, campaigned against the Illyrian ruler Pleuratus I, deposed Arybbas in Epirus in favor of his brother-in-law AlexanderI (through PhilipII's marriage to Olympias), and defeated Cersebleptes in Thrace. This allowed him to extend Macedonian control over the Hellespont in anticipation of an invasion into Achaemenid Anatolia. In 342BC, PhilipII conquered a Thracian city in what is now Bulgaria and renamed it Philippopolis (modern Plovdiv). War broke out with Athens in 340BC while PhilipII was engaged in two ultimately unsuccessful sieges of Perinthus and Byzantion, followed by a successful campaign against the Scythians along the Danube and Macedonia's involvement in the Fourth Sacred War against Amphissa in 339BC. Thebes ejected a Macedonian garrison from Nicaea (near Thermopylae), leading Thebes to join Athens, Megara, Corinth, Achaea, and Euboea in a final confrontation against Macedonia at the Battle of Chaeronea in 338BC. After the Macedonian victory at Chaeronea, PhilipII installed an oligarchy in Thebes, yet was lenient toward Athens, wishing to utilize their navy in a planned invasion of the Achaemenid Empire. He was then chiefly responsible for the formation of the League of Corinth that included the major Greek city-states except Sparta. Despite the Kingdom of Macedonia's official exclusion from the league, in 337BC, PhilipII was elected as the leader (hegemon) of its council (synedrion) and the commander-in-chief (strategos autokrator) of a forthcoming campaign to invade the Achaemenid Empire. Philip's plan to punish the Persians for the suffering of the Greeks and to liberate the Greek cities of Asia Minor as well as perhaps the panhellenic fear of another Persian invasion of Greece, contributed to his decision to invade the Achaemenid Empire. The Persians offered aid to Perinthus and Byzantion in 341–340BC, highlighting Macedonia's strategic need to secure Thrace and the Aegean Sea against increasing Achaemenid encroachment, as the Persian king Artaxerxes III further consolidated his control over satrapies in western Anatolia. The latter region, yielding far more wealth and valuable resources than the Balkans, was also coveted by the Macedonian king for its sheer economic potential.

When Philip II married Cleopatra Eurydice, niece of general Attalus, talk of providing new potential heirs at the wedding feast infuriated PhilipII's son Alexander, a veteran of the Battle of Chaeronea, and his mother Olympias. They fled together to Epirus before Alexander was recalled to Pella by PhilipII. When PhilipII arranged a marriage between his son Arrhidaeus and Ada of Caria, daughter of Pixodarus, the Persian satrap of Caria, Alexander intervened and proposed to marry Ada instead. PhilipII then cancelled the wedding altogether and exiled Alexander's advisors Ptolemy, Nearchus, and Harpalus. To reconcile with Olympias, PhilipII had their daughter Cleopatra marry Olympias' brother (and Cleopatra's uncle) AlexanderI of Epirus, but PhilipII was assassinated by his bodyguard, Pausanias of Orestis, during their wedding feast and succeeded by Alexander in 336BC.

Empire

Modern scholars have argued over the possible role of AlexanderIII "the Great" and his mother Olympias in the assassination of PhilipII, noting the latter's choice to exclude Alexander from his planned invasion of Asia, choosing instead for him to act as regent of Greece and deputy hegemon of the League of Corinth, and the potential bearing of another male heir between PhilipII and his new wife, Cleopatra Eurydice. AlexanderIII was immediately proclaimed king by an assembly of the army and leading aristocrats, chief among them being Antipater and Parmenion. By the end of his reign and military career in 323BC, Alexander would rule over an empire consisting of mainland Greece, Asia Minor, the Levant, ancient Egypt, Mesopotamia, Persia, and much of Central and South Asia (i.e. modern Pakistan). Among his first acts was the burial of his father at Aigai. The members of the League of Corinth revolted at the news of PhilipII's death, but were soon quelled by military force alongside persuasive diplomacy, electing Alexander as hegemon of the league to carry out the planned invasion of Achaemenid Persia.

In 335 BC, Alexander fought against the Thracian tribe of the Triballi at Haemus Mons and along the Danube, forcing their surrender on Peuce Island. Shortly thereafter, the Illyrian chieftain Cleitus, son of Bardylis, threatened to attack Macedonia with the aid of Glaucias, king of the Taulantii, but Alexander took the initiative and besieged the Illyrians at Pelion (in modern Albania). When Thebes had once again revolted from the League of Corinth and was besieging the Macedonian garrison in the Cadmea, Alexander left the Illyrian front and marched to Thebes, which he placed under siege. After breaching the walls, Alexander's forces killed 6,000 Thebans, took 30,000 inhabitants as prisoners of war, and burned the city to the ground as a warning that convinced all other Greek states except Sparta not to challenge Alexander again.

Throughout his military career, Alexander won every battle that he personally commanded. His first victory against the Persians in Asia Minor at the Battle of the Granicus in 334BC used a small cavalry contingent as a distraction to allow his infantry to cross the river followed by a cavalry charge from his companion cavalry. Alexander led the cavalry charge at the Battle of Issus in 333BC, forcing the Persian king Darius III and his army to flee. DariusIII, despite having superior numbers, was again forced to flee the Battle of Gaugamela in 331BC. The Persian king was later captured and executed by his own satrap of Bactria and kinsman, Bessus, in 330BC. The Macedonian king subsequently hunted down and executed Bessus in what is now Afghanistan, securing the region of Sogdia in the process. At the 326BC Battle of the Hydaspes (modern-day Punjab), when the war elephants of King Porus of the Pauravas threatened Alexander's troops, he had them form open ranks to surround the elephants and dislodge their handlers by using their sarissa pikes. When his Macedonian troops threatened mutiny in 324BC at Opis, Babylonia (near modern Baghdad, Iraq), Alexander offered Macedonian military titles and greater responsibilities to Persian officers and units instead, forcing his troops to seek forgiveness at a staged banquet of reconciliation between Persians and Macedonians.

Alexander perhaps undercut his own rule by demonstrating signs of megalomania. While utilizing effective propaganda such as the cutting of the Gordian Knot, he also attempted to portray himself as a living god and son of Zeus following his visit to the oracle at Siwah in the Libyan Desert (in modern-day Egypt) in 331BC. His attempt in 327BC to have his men prostrate before him in Bactra in an act of proskynesis borrowed from the Persian kings was rejected as religious blasphemy by his Macedonian and Greek subjects after his court historian Callisthenes refused to perform this ritual. When Alexander had Parmenion murdered at Ecbatana (near modern Hamadan, Iran) in 330BC, this was "symptomatic of the growing gulf between the king's interests and those of his country and people", according to Errington. His murder of Cleitus the Black in 328BC is described as "vengeful and reckless" by Dawn L. Gilley and Ian Worthington. Continuing the polygamous habits of his father, Alexander encouraged his men to marry native women in Asia, leading by example when he wed Roxana, a Sogdian princess of Bactria. He then married Stateira II, eldest daughter of DariusIII, and Parysatis II, youngest daughter of Artaxerxes III, at the Susa weddings in 324BC.

Meanwhile, in Greece, the Spartan king Agis III attempted to lead a rebellion of the Greeks against Macedonia. He was defeated in 331BC at the Battle of Megalopolis by Antipater, who was serving as regent of Macedonia and deputy hegemon of the League of Corinth in Alexander's stead. Before Antipater embarked on his campaign in the Peloponnese, Memnon, the governor of Thrace, was dissuaded from rebellion by use of diplomacy. Antipater deferred the punishment of Sparta to the League of Corinth headed by Alexander, who ultimately pardoned the Spartans on the condition that they submit fifty nobles as hostages. Antipater's hegemony was somewhat unpopular in Greece due to his practice (perhaps by order of Alexander) of exiling malcontents and garrisoning cities with Macedonian troops, yet in 330BC, Alexander declared that the tyrannies installed in Greece were to be abolished and Greek freedom was to be restored.

When Alexander the Great died at Babylon in 323BC, his mother Olympias immediately accused Antipater and his faction of poisoning him, although there is no evidence to confirm this. With no official heir apparent, the Macedonian military command split, with one side proclaiming Alexander's half-brother PhilipIII Arrhidaeus as king and the other siding with the infant son of Alexander and Roxana, AlexanderIV. Except for the Euboeans and Boeotians, the Greeks also immediately rose up in a rebellion against Antipater known as the Lamian War (323–322BC). When Antipater was defeated at the 323BC Battle of Thermopylae, he fled to Lamia where he was besieged by the Athenian commander Leosthenes. A Macedonian army led by Leonnatus rescued Antipater by lifting the siege. Antipater defeated the rebellion, yet his death in 319BC left a power vacuum wherein the two proclaimed kings of Macedonia became pawns in a power struggle between the diadochi, the former generals of Alexander's army.

A council of the army convened in Babylon immediately after Alexander's death, naming PhilipIII as king and the chiliarch Perdiccas as his regent. Antipater, Antigonus Monophthalmus, Craterus, and Ptolemy formed a coalition against Perdiccas in a civil war initiated by Ptolemy's seizure of the hearse of Alexander the Great. Perdiccas was assassinated in 321BC by his own officers during a failed campaign in Egypt against Ptolemy, where his march along the Nile River resulted in the drowning of 2,000 of his men. Although Eumenes of Cardia managed to kill Craterus in battle, this had little to no effect on the outcome of the 321BC Partition of Triparadisus in Syria where the victorious coalition settled the issue of a new regency and territorial rights. Antipater was appointed as regent over the two kings. Before Antipater died in 319BC, he named the staunch Argead loyalist Polyperchon as his successor, passing over his own son Cassander and ignoring the right of the king to choose a new regent (since PhilipIII was considered mentally unstable), in effect bypassing the council of the army as well.

Forming an alliance with Ptolemy, Antigonus, and Lysimachus, Cassander had his officer Nicanor capture the Munichia fortress of Athens' port town Piraeus in defiance of Polyperchon's decree that Greek cities should be free of Macedonian garrisons, sparking the Second War of the Diadochi (319–315BC). Given a string of military failures by Polyperchon, in 317BC, PhilipIII, by way of his politically engaged wife Eurydice II of Macedon, officially replaced him as regent with Cassander. Afterwards, Polyperchon desperately sought the aid of Olympias in Epirus. A joint force of Epirotes, Aetolians, and Polyperchon's troops invaded Macedonia and forced the surrender of PhilipIII and Eurydice's army, allowing Olympias to execute the king and force his queen to commit suicide. Olympias then had Nicanor and dozens of other Macedonian nobles killed, but by the spring of 316BC, Cassander had defeated her forces, captured her, and placed her on trial for murder before sentencing her to death.

Cassander married Philip II's daughter Thessalonike and briefly extended Macedonian control into Illyria as far as Epidamnos (modern Durrës, Albania). By 313BC, it was retaken by the Illyrian king Glaucias of Taulantii. By 316BC, Antigonus had taken the territory of Eumenes and managed to eject Seleucus Nicator from his Babylonian satrapy, leading Cassander, Ptolemy, and Lysimachus to issue a joint ultimatum to Antigonus in 315BC for him to surrender various territories in Asia. Antigonus promptly allied with Polyperchon, now based in Corinth, and issued an ultimatum of his own to Cassander, charging him with murder for executing Olympias and demanding that he hand over the royal family, King AlexanderIV and the queen mother Roxana. The conflict that followed lasted until the winter of 312/311BC, when a new peace settlement recognized Cassander as general of Europe, Antigonus as "first in Asia", Ptolemy as general of Egypt, and Lysimachus as general of Thrace. Cassander had AlexanderIV and Roxana put to death in the winter of 311/310BC, and between 306 and 305BC the diadochi were declared kings of their respective territories.

Hellenistic era

The beginning of Hellenistic Greece was defined by the struggle between the Antipatrid dynasty, led first by Cassander, son of Antipater, and the Antigonid dynasty, led by the Macedonian general Antigonus I Monophthalmus and his son, the future king DemetriusI. Cassander besieged Athens in 303BC, but was forced to retreat to Macedonia when Demetrius invaded Boeotia to his rear, attempting to sever his path of retreat. While Antigonus and Demetrius attempted to recreate PhilipII's Hellenic league with themselves as dual hegemons, a revived coalition of Cassander, Ptolemy I Soter of Egypt's Ptolemaic dynasty, Seleucus I Nicator of the Seleucid Empire, and Lysimachus, King of Thrace, defeated the Antigonids at the Battle of Ipsus in 301BC, killing Antigonus and forcing Demetrius into flight.

Cassander died in 297 BC, and his sickly son PhilipIV died the same year, succeeded by Cassander's other sons Alexander V of Macedon and Antipater II of Macedon, with their mother Thessalonike of Macedon acting as regent. While Demetrius fought against the Antipatrid forces in Greece, AntipaterII killed his own mother to obtain power. His desperate brother AlexanderV then requested aid from Pyrrhus of Epirus, who had fought alongside Demetrius at the Battle of Ipsus, but was sent to Egypt as a hostage as part of an agreement between Demetrius and PtolemyI. In exchange for defeating the forces of AntipaterII and forcing him to flee to the court of Lysimachus in Thrace, Pyrrhus was awarded the westernmost portions of the Macedonian kingdom. Demetrius had his nephew AlexanderV assassinated and was then proclaimed king of Macedonia, but his subjects protested against his aloof, Eastern-style autocracy.

War broke out between Pyrrhus and Demetrius in 290BC when Lanassa, wife of Pyrrhus, daughter of Agathocles of Syracuse, left him for Demetrius and offered him her dowry of Corcyra. The war dragged on until 288BC, when Demetrius lost the support of the Macedonians and fled the country. Macedonia was then divided between Pyrrhus and Lysimachus, the former taking western Macedonia and the latter eastern Macedonia. By 286BC, Lysimachus had expelled Pyrrhus and his forces from Macedonia. In 282BC, a new war erupted between SeleucusI and Lysimachus; the latter was killed in the Battle of Corupedion, allowing SeleucusI to take control of Thrace and Macedonia. In two dramatic reversals of fortune, SeleucusI was assassinated in 281BC by his officer Ptolemy Keraunos, son of PtolemyI and grandson of Antipater, who was then proclaimed king of Macedonia before being killed in battle in 279BC by Celtic invaders in the Gallic invasion of Greece. The Macedonian army proclaimed the general Sosthenes of Macedon as king, although he apparently refused the title. After defeating the Gallic ruler Bolgios and driving out the raiding party of Brennus, Sosthenes died and left a chaotic situation in Macedonia. The Gallic invaders ravaged Macedonia until Antigonus Gonatas, son of Demetrius, defeated them in Thrace at the 277BC Battle of Lysimachia and was then proclaimed king Antigonus II of Macedon.

In 280 BC, Pyrrhus embarked on a campaign in Magna Graecia (i.e. southern Italy) against the Roman Republic known as the Pyrrhic War, followed by his invasion of Sicily. Ptolemy Keraunos secured his position on the Macedonian throne by giving Pyrrhus five thousand soldiers and twenty war elephants for this endeavor. Pyrrhus returned to Epirus in 275BC after the ultimate failure of both campaigns, which contributed to the rise of Rome because Greek cities in southern Italy such as Tarentum now became Roman allies. Pyrrhus invaded Macedonia in 274BC, defeating the largely mercenary army of AntigonusII at the 274BC Battle of Aous and driving him out of Macedonia, forcing him to seek refuge with his naval fleet in the Aegean.

Pyrrhus lost much of his support among the Macedonians in 273BC when his unruly Gallic mercenaries plundered the royal cemetery of Aigai. Pyrrhus pursued AntigonusII in the Peloponnese, yet AntigonusII was ultimately able to recapture Macedonia. Pyrrhus was killed while besieging Argos in 272BC, allowing AntigonusII to reclaim the rest of Greece. He then restored the Argead dynastic graves at Aigai and annexed the Kingdom of Paeonia.

The Aetolian League hampered AntigonusII's control over central Greece, and the formation of the Achaean League in 251BC pushed Macedonian forces out of much of the Peloponnese and at times incorporated Athens and Sparta. While the Seleucid Empire aligned with Antigonid Macedonia against Ptolemaic Egypt during the Syrian Wars, the Ptolemaic navy heavily disrupted AntigonusII's efforts to control mainland Greece. With the aid of the Ptolemaic navy, the Athenian statesman Chremonides led a revolt against Macedonian authority known as the Chremonidean War (267–261BC). By 265BC, Athens was surrounded and besieged by AntigonusII's forces, and a Ptolemaic fleet was defeated in the Battle of Cos. Athens finally surrendered in 261BC. After Macedonia formed an alliance with the Seleucid ruler Antiochus II, a peace settlement between AntigonusII and Ptolemy II Philadelphus of Egypt was finally struck in 255BC.

In 251 BC, Aratus of Sicyon led a rebellion against AntigonusII, and in 250BC, PtolemyII declared his support for the self-proclaimed King Alexander of Corinth. Although Alexander died in 246BC and Antigonus was able to score a naval victory against the Ptolemies at Andros, the Macedonians lost the Acrocorinth to the forces of Aratus in 243BC, followed by the induction of Corinth into the Achaean League. AntigonusII made peace with the Achaean League in 240BC, ceding the territories that he had lost in Greece. AntigonusII died in 239BC and was succeeded by his son Demetrius II of Macedon. Seeking an alliance with Macedonia to defend against the Aetolians, the queen mother and regent of Epirus, Olympias II, offered her daughter Phthia of Macedon to DemetriusII in marriage. Demetrius II accepted her proposal, but he damaged relations with the Seleucids by divorcing Stratonice of Macedon. Although the Aetolians formed an alliance with the Achaean League as a result, DemetriusII was able to invade Boeotia and capture it from the Aetolians by 236BC.

The Achaean League managed to capture Megalopolis in 235BC, and by the end of DemetriusII's reign most of the Peloponnese except Argos was taken from the Macedonians. DemetriusII also lost an ally in Epirus when the monarchy was toppled in a republican revolution. DemetriusII enlisted the aid of the Illyrian king Agron to defend Acarnania against Aetolia, and in 229BC, they managed to defeat the combined navies of the Aetolian and Achaean Leagues at the Battle of Paxos. Another Illyrian ruler, Longarus of the Dardanian Kingdom, invaded Macedonia and defeated an army of DemetriusII shortly before his death in 229BC. Although his young son Philip immediately inherited the throne, his regent Antigonus III Doson, nephew of AntigonusII, was proclaimed king by the army, with Philip as his heir, following a string of military victories against the Illyrians in the north and the Aetolians in Thessaly.

Aratus sent an embassy to Antigonus III in 226BC seeking an unexpected alliance now that the reformist king Cleomenes III of Sparta was threatening the rest of Greece in the Cleomenean War (229–222BC). In exchange for military aid, AntigonusIII demanded the return of Corinth to Macedonian control, which Aratus finally agreed to in 225BC. In 224BC, AntigonusIII's forces took Arcadia from Sparta. After forming a Hellenic league in the same vein as PhilipII's League of Corinth, he managed to defeat Sparta at the Battle of Sellasia in 222BC. Sparta was occupied by a foreign power for the first time in its history, restoring Macedonia's position as the leading power in Greece. Antigonus died a year later, perhaps from tuberculosis, leaving behind a strong Hellenistic kingdom for his successor PhilipV.

Philip V of Macedon faced immediate challenges to his authority by the Illyrian Dardani and Aetolian League. PhilipV and his allies were successful against the Aetolians and their allies in the Social War (220–217 BC), yet he made peace with the Aetolians once he heard of incursions by the Dardani in the north and the Carthaginian victory over the Romans at the Battle of Lake Trasimene in 217BC. Demetrius of Pharos is alleged to have convinced PhilipV to first secure Illyria in advance of an invasion of the Italian peninsula. In 216BC, PhilipV sent a hundred light warships into the Adriatic Sea to attack Illyria, a move that prompted Scerdilaidas of the Ardiaean Kingdom to appeal to the Romans for aid. Rome responded by sending ten heavy quinqueremes from Roman Sicily to patrol the Illyrian coasts, causing PhilipV to reverse course and order his fleet to retreat, averting open conflict for the time being.

Conflict with Rome

In 215 BC, at the height of the Second Punic War with the Carthaginian Empire, Roman authorities intercepted a ship off the Calabrian coast holding a Macedonian envoy and a Carthaginian ambassador in possession of a treaty composed by Hannibal declaring an alliance with PhilipV. The treaty stipulated that Carthage had the sole right to negotiate the terms of Rome's hypothetical surrender and promised mutual aid if a resurgent Rome should seek revenge against either Macedonia or Carthage. Although the Macedonians were perhaps only interested in safeguarding their newly conquered territories in Illyria, the Romans were nevertheless able to thwart whatever grand ambitions PhilipV had for the Adriatic region during the First Macedonian War (214–205BC). In 214BC, Rome positioned a naval fleet at Oricus, which was assaulted along with Apollonia by Macedonian forces. When the Macedonians captured Lissus in 212BC, the Roman Senate responded by inciting the Aetolian League, Sparta, Elis, Messenia, and Attalus I of Pergamon to wage war against PhilipV, keeping him occupied and away from Italy.

The Aetolian League concluded a peace agreement with PhilipV in 206BC, and the Roman Republic negotiated the Treaty of Phoenice in 205BC, ending the war and allowing the Macedonians to retain some captured settlements in Illyria. Although the Romans rejected an Aetolian request in 202BC for Rome to declare war on Macedonia once again, the Roman Senate gave serious consideration to the similar offer made by Pergamon and its ally Rhodes in 201BC. These states were concerned about PhilipV's alliance with Antiochus III the Great of the Seleucid Empire, which invaded the war-weary and financially exhausted Ptolemaic Empire in the Fifth Syrian War (202–195BC) as PhilipV captured Ptolemaic settlements in the Aegean Sea. Although Rome's envoys played a critical role in convincing Athens to join the anti-Macedonian alliance with Pergamon and Rhodes in 200BC, the comitia centuriata (people's assembly) rejected the Roman Senate's proposal for a declaration of war on Macedonia. Meanwhile, PhilipV conquered territories in the Hellespont and Bosporus as well as Ptolemaic Samos, which led Rhodes to form an alliance with Pergamon, Byzantium, Cyzicus, and Chios against Macedonia. Despite PhilipV's nominal alliance with the Seleucid king, he lost the naval Battle of Chios in 201BC and was blockaded at Bargylia by the Rhodian and Pergamene navies.

While Philip V was busy fighting Rome's Greek allies, Rome viewed this as an opportunity to punish this former ally of Hannibal with a war that they hoped would supply a victory and require few resources. The Roman Senate demanded that PhilipV cease hostilities against neighboring Greek powers and defer to an international arbitration committee for settling grievances. When the comitia centuriata finally voted in approval of the Roman Senate's declaration of war in 200BC and handed their ultimatum to PhilipV, demanding that a tribunal assess the damages owed to Rhodes and Pergamon, the Macedonian king rejected it. This marked the beginning of the Second Macedonian War (200–197BC), with Publius Sulpicius Galba Maximus spearheading military operations in Apollonia.

The Macedonians successfully defended their territory for roughly two years, but the Roman consul Titus Quinctius Flamininus managed to expel PhilipV from Macedonia in 198BC, forcing his men to take refuge in Thessaly. When the Achaean League switched their loyalties from Macedonia to Rome, the Macedonian king sued for peace, but the terms offered were considered too stringent, and so the war continued. In June 197BC, the Macedonians were defeated at the Battle of Cynoscephalae. Rome then ratified a treaty that forced Macedonia to relinquish control of much of its Greek possessions outside of Macedonia proper, if only to act as a buffer against Illyrian and Thracian incursions into Greece. Although some Greeks suspected Roman intentions of supplanting Macedonia as the new hegemonic power in Greece, Flaminius announced at the Isthmian Games of 196BC that Rome intended to preserve Greek liberty by leaving behind no garrisons and by not exacting tribute of any kind. His promise was delayed by negotiations with the Spartan king Nabis, who had meanwhile captured Argos, yet Roman forces evacuated Greece in 194BC.

Encouraged by the Aetolian League and their calls to liberate Greece from the Romans, the Seleucid king AntiochusIII landed with his army at Demetrias, Thessaly, in 192BC, and was elected strategos by the Aetolians. Macedonia, the Achaean League, and other Greek city-states maintained their alliance with Rome. The Romans defeated the Seleucids in the 191BC Battle of Thermopylae as well as the Battle of Magnesia in 190BC, forcing the Seleucids to pay a war indemnity, dismantle most of its navy, and abandon its claims to any territories north or west of the Taurus Mountains in the 188BC Treaty of Apamea. With Rome's acceptance, PhilipV was able to capture some cities in central Greece in 191–189BC that had been allied to AntiochusIII, while Rhodes and Eumenes II of Pergamon gained territories in Asia Minor.

Failing to please all sides in various territorial disputes, the Roman Senate decided in 184/183BC to force PhilipV to abandon Aenus and Maronea, since these had been declared free cities in the Treaty of Apamea. This assuaged the fear of EumenesII that Macedonia could pose a threat to his lands in the Hellespont. Perseus of Macedon succeeded PhilipV and executed his brother Demetrius, who had been favored by the Romans but was charged by Perseus with high treason. Perseus then attempted to form marriage alliances with Prusias II of Bithynia and Seleucus IV Philopator of the Seleucid Empire, along with renewed relations with Rhodes that greatly unsettled EumenesII. Although EumenesII attempted to undermine these diplomatic relationships, Perseus fostered an alliance with the Boeotian League, extended his authority into Illyria and Thrace, and in 174BC, won the role of managing the Temple of Apollo at Delphi as a member of the Amphictyonic Council.

Eumenes II came to Rome in 172 BC and delivered a speech to the Senate denouncing the alleged crimes and transgressions of Perseus. This convinced the Roman Senate to declare the Third Macedonian War (171–168BC). Although Perseus's forces were victorious against the Romans at the Battle of Callinicus in 171BC, the Macedonian army was defeated at the Battle of Pydna in June 168BC. Perseus fled to Samothrace but surrendered shortly afterwards, was brought to Rome for the triumph of Lucius Aemilius Paullus Macedonicus, and was placed under house arrest at Alba Fucens, where he died in 166BC. The Romans abolished the Macedonian monarchy by installing four separate allied republics in its stead, their capitals located at Amphipolis, Thessalonica, Pella, and Pelagonia. The Romans imposed severe laws inhibiting many social and economic interactions between the inhabitants of these republics, including the banning of marriages between them and the (temporary) prohibition on gold and silver mining. A certain Andriscus, claiming Antigonid descent, rebelled against the Romans and was pronounced king of Macedonia, defeating the army of the Roman praetor Publius Juventius Thalna during the Fourth Macedonian War (150–148BC). Despite this, Andriscus was defeated in 148BC at the second Battle of Pydna by Quintus Caecilius Metellus Macedonicus, whose forces occupied the kingdom. This was followed in 146BC by the Roman destruction of Carthage and victory over the Achaean League at the Battle of Corinth, ushering in the era of Roman Greece and the gradual establishment of the Roman province of Macedonia.

Institutions

Division of power

At the head of Macedonia's government was the king (basileus). From at least the reign of PhilipII, the king was assisted by the royal pages (basilikoi paides), bodyguards (somatophylakes), companions (hetairoi), friends (philoi), an assembly that included members of the military, and (during the Hellenistic period) magistrates. Evidence is lacking regarding the extent to which each of these groups shared authority with the king or if their existence had a basis in a formal constitutional framework. Before the reign of PhilipII, the only institution supported by textual evidence is the monarchy.

Kingship and the royal court
The earliest known government of ancient Macedonia was that of its monarchy, lasting until 167BC when it was abolished by the Romans. The Macedonian hereditary monarchy existed since at least the time of Archaic Greece, with Homeric aristocratic roots in Mycenaean Greece. Thucydides wrote that in previous ages, Macedonia was divided into small tribal regions, each having its own petty king, the tribes of Lower Macedonia eventually coalescing under one great king who exercised power as an overlord over the lesser kings of Upper Macedonia. The direct line of father-to-son succession was broken after the assassination of Orestes of Macedon in 396BC (allegedly by his regent and successor Aeropus II of Macedon), clouding the issue of whether primogeniture was the established custom or if there was a constitutional right for an assembly of the army or of the people to choose another king. It is unclear if the male offspring of Macedonian queens or consorts were always preferred over others given the accession of Archelaus I of Macedon, son of Perdiccas II of Macedon and a slave woman, although Archelaus succeeded the throne after murdering his father's designated heir apparent.

It is known that Macedonian kings before PhilipII upheld the privileges and carried out the responsibilities of hosting foreign diplomats, determining the kingdom's foreign policies, and negotiating alliances with foreign powers. After the Greek victory at Salamis in 480BC, the Persian commander Mardonius had Alexander I of Macedon sent to Athens as a chief envoy to orchestrate an alliance between the Achaemenid Empire and Athens. The decision to send Alexander was based on his marriage alliance with a noble Persian house and his previous formal relationship with the city-state of Athens. With their ownership of natural resources including gold, silver, timber, and royal land, the early Macedonian kings were also capable of bribing foreign and domestic parties with impressive gifts.

Little is known about the judicial system of ancient Macedonia except that the king acted as the chief judge of the kingdom. The Macedonian kings were also supreme commanders of the military. PhilipII was also highly regarded for his acts of piety in serving as the high priest of the nation. He performed daily ritual sacrifices and led religious festivals. Alexander imitated various aspects of his father's reign, such as granting land and gifts to loyal aristocratic followers, but lost some core support among them for adopting some of the trappings of an Eastern, Persian monarch, a "lord and master" as Carol J. King suggests, instead of a "comrade-in-arms" as was the traditional relationship of Macedonian kings with their companions. Alexander's father, PhilipII, was perhaps influenced by Persian traditions when he adopted institutions similar to those found in the Achaemenid realm, such as having a royal secretary, royal archive, royal pages, and a seated throne.

Royal pages

The royal pages were adolescent boys and young men conscripted from aristocratic households and serving the kings of Macedonia perhaps from the reign of PhilipII onward, although more solid evidence dates to the reign of Alexander the Great. Royal pages played no direct role in high politics and were conscripted as a means to introduce them to political life. After a period of training and service, pages were expected to become members of the king's companions and personal retinue. During their training, pages were expected to guard the king as he slept, supply him with horses, aid him in mounting his horse, accompany him on royal hunts, and serve him during symposia (i.e. formal drinking parties). Although there is little evidence for royal pages in the Antigonid period, it is known that some of them fled with Perseus of Macedon to Samothrace following his defeat by the Romans in 168BC.

Bodyguards
Royal bodyguards served as the closest members to the king at court and on the battlefield. They were split into two categories: the agema of the hypaspistai, a type of ancient special forces usually numbering in the hundreds, and a smaller group of men handpicked by the king either for their individual merits or to honor the noble families to which they belonged. Therefore, the bodyguards, limited in number and forming the king's inner circle, were not always responsible for protecting the king's life on and off the battlefield; their title and office was more a mark of distinction, perhaps used to quell rivalries between aristocratic houses.

Companions, friends, councils, and assemblies

The companions, including the elite companion cavalry and pezhetairoi infantry, represented a substantially larger group than the king's bodyguards. The most trusted or highest ranking companions formed a council that served as an advisory body to the king. A small amount of evidence suggests the existence of an assembly of the army during times of war and a people's assembly during times of peace.

Members of the council had the right to speak freely, and although there is no direct evidence that they voted on affairs of state, it is clear that the king was at least occasionally pressured to agree to their demands. The assembly was apparently given the right to judge cases of high treason and assign punishments for them, such as when Alexander the Great acted as prosecutor in the trial and conviction of three alleged conspirators in his father's assassination plot (while many others were acquitted). However, there is perhaps insufficient evidence to allow a conclusion that councils and assemblies were regularly upheld or constitutionally grounded, or that their decisions were always heeded by the king. At the death of Alexander the Great, the companions immediately formed a council to assume control of his empire, but it was soon destabilized by open rivalry and conflict between its members. The army also used mutiny as a tool to achieve political ends.

Magistrates, the commonwealth, local government, and allied states
Antigonid Macedonian kings relied on various regional officials to conduct affairs of state. This included high-ranking municipal officials, such as the military strategos and the politarch, i.e. the elected governor (archon) of a large city (polis), as well as the politico-religious office of the epistates. No evidence exists about the personal backgrounds of these officials, although they may have been chosen among the same group of aristocratic philoi and hetairoi who filled vacancies for army officers.

In ancient Athens, the Athenian democracy was restored on three separate occasions following the initial conquest of the city by Antipater in 322BC. When it fell repeatedly under Macedonian rule it was governed by a Macedonian-imposed oligarchy composed of the wealthiest members of the city-state. Other city-states were handled quite differently and were allowed a greater degree of autonomy. After PhilipII conquered Amphipolis in 357BC, the city was allowed to retain its democracy, including its constitution, popular assembly, city council (boule), and yearly elections for new officials, but a Macedonian garrison was housed within the city walls along with a Macedonian royal commissioner (epistates) to monitor the city's political affairs. Philippi, the city founded by PhilipII, was the only other city in the Macedonian commonwealth that had a democratic government with popular assemblies, since the assembly (ecclesia) of Thessaloniki seems to have had only a passive function in practice. Some cities also maintained their own municipal revenues. The Macedonian king and central government administered the revenues generated by temples and priesthoods.

Within the Macedonian commonwealth, some evidence from the 3rd centuryBC indicates that foreign relations were handled by the central government. Although individual Macedonian cities nominally participated in Panhellenic events as independent entities, in reality, the granting of asylia (inviolability, diplomatic immunity, and the right of asylum at sanctuaries) to certain cities was handled directly by the king. Likewise, the city-states within contemporary Greek koina (i.e., federations of city-states, the sympoliteia) obeyed the federal decrees voted on collectively by the members of their league. In city-states belonging to a league or commonwealth, the granting of proxenia (i.e. the hosting of foreign ambassadors) was usually a right shared by local and central authorities. Abundant evidence exists for the granting of proxenia as being the sole prerogative of central authorities in the neighboring Epirote League, and some evidence suggests the same arrangement in the Macedonian commonwealth. City-states that were allied with Macedonia issued their own decrees regarding proxenia. Foreign leagues also formed alliances with the Macedonian kings, such as when the Cretan League signed treaties with Demetrius II Aetolicus and Antigonus III Doson ensuring enlistment of Cretan mercenaries into the Macedonian army, and elected Philip V of Macedon as honorary protector (prostates) of the league.

Military

Early Macedonian army

The basic structure of the Ancient Macedonian army was the division between the companion cavalry (hetairoi) and the foot companions (pezhetairoi), augmented by various allied troops, foreign levied soldiers, and mercenaries. The foot companions existed perhaps since the reign of Alexander I of Macedon. Macedonian cavalry, wearing muscled cuirasses, became renowned in Greece during and after their involvement in the Peloponnesian War, at times siding with either Athens or Sparta. Macedonian infantry in this period consisted of poorly trained shepherds and farmers, while the cavalry was composed of noblemen. As evidenced by early 4th century BC artwork, there was a pronounced Spartan influence on the Macedonian army before PhilipII. Nicholas Viktor Sekunda states that at the beginning of PhilipII's reign in 359BC, the Macedonian army consisted of 10,000 infantry and 600 cavalry, yet Malcolm Errington cautions that these figures cited by ancient authors should be treated with some skepticism.

Philip II and Alexander the Great

After spending years as a political hostage in Thebes, PhilipII sought to imitate the Greek example of martial exercises and the issuing of standard equipment for citizen soldiery, and succeeded in transforming the Macedonian army from a levied force of unprofessional farmers into a well-trained, professional army. PhilipII adopted some of the military tactics of his enemies, such as the embolon (flying wedge) cavalry formation of the Scythians. His infantry wielded peltai shields that replaced the earlier aspis-style shields, were equipped with protective helmets, greaves, and either cuirasses breastplates or kotthybos stomach bands, and armed with sarissa pikes and  daggers as  secondary weapons. The elite hypaspistai infantry, composed of handpicked men from the ranks of the pezhetairoi, were formed during the reign of PhilipII and saw continued use during the reign of Alexander the Great. PhilipII was also responsible for the establishment of the royal bodyguards (somatophylakes).

For his lighter missile troops, Philip II employed mercenary Cretan archers as well as Thracian, Paeonian, and Illyrian javelin throwers, slingers, and archers. He hired engineers such as Polyidus of Thessaly and Diades of Pella, who were capable of building state of the art siege engines and artillery that fired large bolts. Following the acquisition of the lucrative mines at Krinides (renamed Philippi), the royal treasury could afford to field a permanent, professional standing army. The increase in state revenues under PhilipII allowed the Macedonians to build a small navy for the first time, which included triremes.

The only Macedonian cavalry units attested under Alexander were the companion cavalry, yet he formed a hipparchia (i.e. unit of a few hundred horsemen) of companion cavalry composed entirely of ethnic Persians while campaigning in Asia. When marching his forces into Asia, Alexander brought 1,800 cavalrymen from Macedonia, 1,800 cavalrymen from Thessaly, 600 cavalrymen from the rest of Greece, and 900 prodromoi cavalry from Thrace. Antipater was able to quickly raise a force of 600 native Macedonian cavalry to fight in the Lamian War when it began in 323BC. The most elite members of Alexander's hypaspistai were designated as the agema, and a new term for hypaspistai emerged after the Battle of Gaugamela in 331BC: the argyraspides (silver shields). The latter continued to serve after the reign of Alexander the Great and may have been of Asian origin. Overall, his pike-wielding phalanx infantry numbered some 12,000 men, 3,000 of which were elite hypaspistai and 9,000 of which were pezhetairoi. Alexander continued the use of Cretan archers and introduced native Macedonian archers into the army. After the Battle of Gaugamela, archers of West Asian backgrounds became commonplace.

Antigonid period military

The Macedonian army continued to evolve under the Antigonid dynasty. It is uncertain how many men were appointed as somatophylakes, which numbered eight men at the end of Alexander the Great's reign, while the hypaspistai seem to have morphed into assistants of the somatophylakes. At the Battle of Cynoscephalae in 197BC, the Macedonians commanded some 16,000 phalanx pikemen. Alexander the Great's royal squadron of companion cavalry contained 800 men, the same number of cavalrymen in the sacred squadron (Latin: sacra ala; Greek: hiera ile) commanded by Philip V of Macedon during the Social War of 219BC. The regular Macedonian cavalry numbered 3,000 at Callinicus, which was separate from the sacred squadron and royal cavalry. While Macedonian cavalry of the 4th century BC had fought without shields, the use of shields by cavalry was adopted from the Celtic invaders of the 270s BC who settled in Galatia, central Anatolia.

Thanks to contemporary inscriptions from Amphipolis and Greia dated 218 and 181BC, respectively, historians have been able to partially piece together the organization of the Antigonid army under PhilipV. From at least the time of Antigonus III Doson, the most elite Antigonid-period infantry were the peltasts, lighter and more maneuverable soldiers wielding peltai javelins, swords, and a smaller bronze shield than Macedonian phalanx pikemen, although they sometimes served in that capacity. Among the peltasts, roughly 2,000 men were selected to serve in the elite agema vanguard, with other peltasts numbering roughly 3,000. The number of peltasts varied over time, perhaps never more than 5,000 men. They fought alongside the phalanx pikemen, divided now into chalkaspides (bronze shield) and leukaspides (white shield) regiments.

The Antigonid Macedonian kings continued to expand and equip the navy. Cassander maintained a small fleet at Pydna, Demetrius I of Macedon had one at Pella, and Antigonus II Gonatas, while serving as a general for Demetrius in Greece, used the navy to secure the Macedonian holdings in Demetrias, Chalkis, Piraeus, and Corinth. The navy was considerably expanded during the Chremonidean War (267–261BC), allowing the Macedonian navy to defeat the Ptolemaic Egyptian navy at the 255BC Battle of Cos and 245BC Battle of Andros, and enabling Macedonian influence to spread over the Cyclades. AntigonusIII Doson used the Macedonian navy to invade Caria, while PhilipV sent 200 ships to fight in the Battle of Chios in 201BC. The Macedonian navy was reduced to a mere six vessels as agreed in the 197BC peace treaty that concluded the Second Macedonian War with the Roman Republic, although Perseus of Macedon quickly assembled some lemboi at the outbreak of the Third Macedonian War in 171BC.

Society and culture

Language and dialects

Following its adoption as the court language of Philip II of Macedon's regime, authors of ancient Macedonia wrote their works in Koine Greek, the lingua franca of late Classical and Hellenistic Greece. Rare textual evidence indicates that the native Macedonian language was either a dialect of Greek similar to Thessalian Greek and Northwestern Greek, or a language closely related to Greek. The vast majority of surviving inscriptions from ancient Macedonia were written in Attic Greek and its successor Koine. Attic (and later Koine) Greek was the preferred language of the Ancient Macedonian army, although it is known that Alexander the Great once shouted an emergency order in Macedonian to his royal guards during the drinking party where he killed Cleitus the Black. Macedonian became extinct in either the Hellenistic or the Roman period, and entirely replaced by Koine Greek.

Religious beliefs and funerary practices

By the 5th century BC, the Macedonians and the southern Greeks worshiped more or less the same deities of the Greek pantheon. In Macedonia, political and religious offices were often intertwined. For instance, the head of state for the city of Amphipolis also served as the priest of Asklepios, Greek god of medicine; a similar arrangement existed at Cassandreia, where a cult priest honoring the city's founder Cassander was the nominal head of the city. The main sanctuary of Zeus was maintained at Dion, while another at Veria was dedicated to Herakles and was patronized by Demetrius II Aetolicus. Meanwhile, foreign cults from Egypt were fostered by the royal court, such as the temple of Sarapis at Thessaloniki. The Macedonians also had relations with "international" cults; for example, Macedonian kings Philip III of Macedon and Alexander IV of Macedon made votive offerings to the internationally esteemed Samothrace temple complex of the Cabeiri mystery cult.

In the three royal tombs at Vergina, professional painters decorated the walls with a mythological scene of Hades abducting Persephone and royal hunting scenes, while lavish grave goods including weapons, armor, drinking vessels, and personal items were housed with the dead, whose bones were burned before burial in golden coffins. Some grave goods and decorations were common in other Macedonian tombs, yet some items found at Vergina were distinctly tied to royalty, including a diadem, luxurious goods, and arms and armor. Scholars have debated about the identity of the tomb occupants since the discovery of their remains in 1977–1978, and recent research and forensic examination have concluded that at least one of the persons buried was PhilipII. Located near Tomb1 are the above-ground ruins of a heroon, a shrine for cult worship of the dead. In 2014, the ancient Macedonian Kasta Tomb was discovered outside of Amphipolis and is the largest ancient tomb found in Greece (as of 2017).

Economics and social class

Young Macedonian men were typically expected to engage in hunting and martial combat as a by-product of their transhumance lifestyle of herding livestock such as goats and sheep, while horse breeding and raising cattle were other common pursuits. Some Macedonians engaged in farming, often with irrigation, land reclamation, and horticulture activities supported by the Macedonian state. The Macedonian economy and state finances were mainly supported by logging and by mining valuable minerals such as copper, iron, gold, and silver. The conversion of these raw materials into finished products and the sale of those products encouraged the growth of urban centers and a gradual shift away from the traditional rustic Macedonian lifestyle during the course of the 5thcenturyBC.

The Macedonian king was an autocratic figure at the head of both government and society, with arguably unlimited authority to handle affairs of state and public policy, but he was also the leader of a very personal regime with close relationships or connections to his hetairoi, the core of the Macedonian aristocracy. These aristocrats were second only to the king in terms of power and privilege, filling the ranks of his administration and serving as commanding officers in the military. It was in the more bureaucratic regimes of the Hellenistic kingdoms that succeeded Alexander the Great's empire where greater social mobility for members of society seeking to join the aristocracy could be found, especially in Ptolemaic Egypt. Although governed by a king and martial aristocracy, Macedonia seems to have lacked the widespread use of slaves seen in contemporaneous Greek states.

Visual arts

By the reign of ArchelausI in the 5th century BC, the ancient Macedonian elite was importing customs and artistic traditions from other regions of Greece while retaining more archaic, perhaps Homeric, funerary rites connected with the symposium that were typified by items such as the decorative metal kraters that held the ashes of deceased Macedonian nobility in their tombs. Among these is the large bronze Derveni Krater from a 4th-centuryBC tomb of Thessaloniki, decorated with scenes of the Greek god Dionysus and his entourage and belonging to an aristocrat who had had a military career. Macedonian metalwork usually followed Athenian styles of vase shapes from the 6thcenturyBC onward, with drinking vessels, jewellery, containers, crowns, diadems, and coins among the many metal objects found in Macedonian tombs.

Surviving Macedonian painted artwork includes frescoes and murals, but also decoration on sculpted artwork such as statues and reliefs. For instance, trace colors still exist on the bas-reliefs of the late 4th-century BC Alexander Sarcophagus. Macedonian paintings have allowed historians to investigate the clothing fashions as well as military gear worn by the ancient Macedonians. Aside from metalwork and painting, mosaics are another significant form of surviving Macedonian artwork. The Stag Hunt Mosaic of Pella, with its three-dimensional qualities and illusionist style, show clear influence from painted artwork and wider Hellenistic art trends, although the rustic theme of hunting was tailored to Macedonian tastes. The similar Lion Hunt Mosaic of Pella illustrates either a scene of Alexander the Great with his companion Craterus, or simply a conventional illustration of the royal diversion of hunting. Mosaics with mythological themes include scenes of Dionysus riding a panther and Helen of Troy being abducted by Theseus, the latter of which employs illusionist qualities and realistic shading similar to Macedonian paintings. Common themes of Macedonian paintings and mosaics include warfare, hunting, and aggressive masculine sexuality (i.e. abduction of women for rape or marriage); these subjects are at times combined within a single work and perhaps indicate a metaphorical connection.

Theatre, music and performing arts

Philip II was assassinated in 336 BC at the theatre of Aigai, amid games and spectacles celebrating the marriage of his daughter Cleopatra. Alexander the Great was allegedly a great admirer of both theatre and music. He was especially fond of the plays by Classical Athenian tragedians Aeschylus, Sophocles, and Euripides, whose works formed part of a proper Greek education for his new eastern subjects alongside studies in the Greek language, including the epics of Homer. While he and his army were stationed at Tyre (in modern-day Lebanon), Alexander had his generals act as judges not only for athletic contests but also for stage performances of Greek tragedies. The contemporaneous famous actors Thessalus and Athenodorus performed at the event.

Music was also appreciated in Macedonia. In addition to the agora, the gymnasium, the theatre, and religious sanctuaries and temples dedicated to Greek gods and goddesses, one of the main markers of a true Greek city in the empire of Alexander the Great was the presence of an odeon for musical performances. This was the case not only for Alexandria in Egypt, but also for cities as distant as Ai-Khanoum in what is now modern-day Afghanistan.

Literature, education, philosophy, and patronage

Perdiccas II of Macedon was able to host well-known Classical Greek intellectual visitors at his royal court, such as the lyric poet Melanippides and the renowned medical doctor Hippocrates, and Pindar's enkomion written for Alexander I of Macedon may have been composed at his court. ArchelausI received many more Greek scholars, artists, and celebrities at his court than his predecessors. His honored guests included the painter Zeuxis, the architect Callimachus, the poets Choerilus of Samos, Timotheus of Miletus, and Agathon, as well as the famous Athenian playwright Euripides. The philosopher Aristotle, who studied at the Platonic Academy of Athens and established the Aristotelian school of thought, moved to Macedonia, and is said to have tutored the young Alexander the Great, as well as serving as an esteemed diplomat for PhilipII. Among Alexander's retinue of artists, writers, and philosophers was Pyrrho of Elis, founder of Pyrrhonism, the school of philosophical skepticism. During the Antigonid period, Antigonos Gonatas fostered cordial relationships with Menedemos of Eretria, founder of the Eretrian school of philosophy, and Zenon, the founder of Stoicism.

In terms of early Greek historiography and later Roman historiography, Felix Jacoby identified thirteen possible ancient historians who wrote about Macedonia in his Fragmente der griechischen Historiker. Aside from accounts in Herodotus and Thucydides, the works compiled by Jacoby are only fragmentary, whereas other works are completely lost, such as the history of an Illyrian war fought by Perdiccas III written by Antipater. The Macedonian historians Marsyas of Pella and Marsyas of Philippi wrote histories of Macedonia, the Ptolemaic king Ptolemy I Soter authored a history about Alexander, and Hieronymus of Cardia wrote a history about Alexander's royal successors. Following the Indian campaign of Alexander the Great, the Macedonian military officer Nearchus wrote a work of his voyage from the mouth of the Indus river to the Persian Gulf. The Macedonian historian Craterus published a compilation of decrees made by the popular assembly of the Athenian democracy, ostensibly while attending the school of Aristotle. Philip V of Macedon had manuscripts of the history of PhilipII written by Theopompus gathered by his court scholars and disseminated with further copies.

Sports and leisure

When Alexander I of Macedon petitioned to compete in the foot race of the ancient Olympic Games, the event organizers at first denied his request, explaining that only Greeks were allowed to compete. However, AlexanderI produced proof of an Argead royal genealogy showing ancient Argive Temenid lineage, a move that ultimately convinced the Olympic Hellanodikai authorities of his Greek descent and ability to compete. By the end of the 5thcenturyBC, the Macedonian king ArchelausI was crowned with the olive wreath at both Olympia and Delphi (in the Pythian Games) for winning chariot racing contests. PhilipII allegedly heard of the Olympic victory of his horse (in either an individual horse race or chariot race) on the same day his son Alexander the Great was born, on either 19 or 20July 356BC. Non-royal Macedonians also competed in and won various Olympic contests by the 4th century BC. In addition to literary contests, Alexander the Great staged competitions for music and athletics across his empire.

Dining and cuisine

Ancient Macedonia produced only a few fine foods or beverages that were highly appreciated elsewhere in the Greek world, including eels from the Strymonian Gulf and special wine produced in Chalcidice. The earliest known use of flat bread as a plate for meat was made in Macedonia during the 3rdcenturyBC, which perhaps influenced the later trencher bread of medieval Europe. Cattle and goats were consumed, although there was no notice of Macedonian mountain cheeses in literature until the Middle Ages. The comedic playwright Menander wrote that Macedonian dining habits penetrated Athenian high society; for instance, the introduction of meats into the dessert course of a meal. The Macedonians also most likely introduced mattye to Athenian cuisine, a dish usually made of chicken or other spiced, salted, and sauced meats served during the wine course. This particular dish was derided and connected with licentiousness and drunkenness in a play by the Athenian comic poet Alexis about the declining morals of Athenians in the age of Demetrius I of Macedon.

The symposium in the Macedonian and wider Greek realm was a banquet for the nobility and privileged class, an occasion for feasting, drinking, entertainment, and sometimes philosophical discussion. The hetairoi, leading members of the Macedonian aristocracy, were expected to attend such feasts with their king. They were also expected to accompany him on royal hunts for the acquisition of game meat as well as for sport.

Ethnic identity

Ancient authors and modern scholars alike disagree about the ethnic identity of the ancient Macedonians. Ernst Badian notes that nearly all surviving references to antagonisms and differences between Greeks and Macedonians exist in the written speeches of Arrian, who lived at the time of the Roman Empire, when any notion of an ethnic disparity between Macedonians and other Greeks was incomprehensible. Hatzopoulos argues that there was no real ethnic difference between Macedonians and Greeks, only a political distinction contrived after the creation of the League of Corinth in 337BC (which was led by Macedonia through the league's elected hegemon PhilipII, when he was not a member of the league itself), N. G. L. Hammond asserts that ancient views differentiating Macedonia's ethnic identity from the rest of the Greek-speaking world should be seen as an expression of conflict between two different political systems: the democratic system of the city-states (e.g. Athens) versus the monarchy (Macedonia). Other academics who concur that the difference between the Macedonians and Greeks was a political rather than a true ethnic discrepancy include Michael B. Sakellariou, Malcolm Errington, and Craige B. Champion.

Anson argues that some Hellenic authors expressed complex or even ever-changing and ambiguous ideas about the exact ethnic identity of the Macedonians, who were considered by some such as Aristotle in his Politics as barbarians and others as semi-Greek or fully Greek. Roger D. Woodard asserts that in addition to persisting uncertainty in modern times about the proper classification of the Macedonian language and its relation to Greek, ancient authors also presented conflicting ideas about the Macedonians. Simon Hornblower argues on the Greek identity of the Macedonians, taking into consideration their origin, language, cults and customs. Any preconceived ethnic differences between Greeks and Macedonians faded by 148BC soon after the Roman conquest of Macedonia and then the rest of Greece with the defeat of the Achaean League by the Roman Republic at the Battle of Corinth (146 BC).

Technology and engineering

Architecture

Macedonian architecture, although utilizing a mixture of different forms and styles from the rest of Greece, did not represent a unique or diverging style from other ancient Greek architecture. Among the classical orders, Macedonian architects favored the Ionic order, especially in the peristyle courtyards of private homes. There are several surviving examples, albeit in ruins, of Macedonian palatial architecture, including a palace at the site of the capital Pella, the summer residence of Vergina near the old capital Aigai, and the royal residence at Demetrias near modern Volos. At Vergina, the ruins of three large banquet halls with marble-tiled floors (covered in the debris of roof tiles) with floor plan dimensions measuring roughly 16.7 x 17.6 m (54.8 x 57.7 ft) demonstrate perhaps the earliest examples of monumental triangular roof trusses, if dated before the reign of Antigonus II Gonatas or even the onset of the Hellenistic period. Later Macedonian architecture also featured arches and vaults. The palaces of both Vergina and Demetrias had walls made of sundried bricks, while the latter palace had four corner towers around a central courtyard in the manner of a fortified residence fit for a king or at least a military governor.

Macedonian rulers also sponsored works of architecture outside of Macedonia proper. For instance, following his victory at the Battle of Chaeronea (338 BC), PhilipII raised a round memorial building at Olympia known as the Philippeion, decorated inside with statues depicting him, his parents Amyntas III of Macedon and Eurydice I of Macedon, his wife Olympias, and his son Alexander the Great.

The ruins of roughly twenty Greek theatres survive in the present-day regions of Macedonia and Thrace in Greece: sixteen open-air theatres, three odea, and a possible theatre in Veria undergoing excavation.

Military technology and engineering

By the Hellenistic period, it became common for Greek states to finance the development and proliferation of ever more powerful torsion siege engines, naval ships, and standardized designs for arms and armor. Under PhilipII and Alexander the Great, improvements were made to siege artillery such as bolt-shooting ballistae and siege engines such as huge rolling siege towers. E.W.Marsden and M.Y.Treister contend that the Macedonian rulers Antigonus I Monophthalmus and his successor Demetrius I of Macedon had the most powerful siege artillery of the Hellenistic world at the end of the 4thcenturyBC. The siege of Salamis, Cyprus, in 306BC necessitated the building of large siege engines and drafting of craftsmen from parts of West Asia. The siege tower commissioned by DemetriusI for the Macedonian Siege of Rhodes (305–304 BC) and defended by over three thousand soldiers was built at a height of nine stories.

During the siege of Echinus by Philip V of Macedon in 211BC, the besiegers built tunnels to protect the soldiers and sappers as they went back and forth from the camp to the siege works. These included two siege towers connected by a makeshift wickerwork curtain wall mounted with stone-shooting ballistae, and sheds to protect the approach of the battering ram. Despite the early reputation of Macedon as a leader in siege technology, Alexandria in Ptolemaic Egypt became the center for technological improvements to the catapult by the 3rdcenturyBC, as evidenced by the writings of Philo of Alexandria.

Other innovations

Although perhaps not as prolific as other areas of Greece in regards to technological innovations, there are some inventions that may have originated in Macedonia aside from siege engines and artillery. The rotary-operated olive press for producing olive oil may have been invented in ancient Macedonia or another part of Greece, or even as far east as the Levant or Anatolia. Mold-pressed glass first appeared in Macedonia in the 4thcenturyBC (although it could have simultaneously existed in the Achaemenid Empire); the first known clear, translucent glass pieces of the Greek world have been discovered in Macedonia and Rhodes and date to the second half of the 4thcenturyBC. Greek technical and scientific literature began with Classical Athens in the 5thcenturyBC, while the major production centers for technical innovation and texts during the Hellenistic period were Alexandria, Rhodes, and Pergamon.

Currency, finances, and resources

The minting of silver coinage began during the reign of AlexanderI as a means to pay for royal expenditures. ArchelausI increased the silver content of his coins as well as minting copper coins to promote foreign and domestic commerce. The minting of coinage significantly increased during the reigns of PhilipII and Alexander the Great, especially after the increase in state revenues following the seizure of the Pangaion Hills. During the Hellenistic period the royal houses of Macedonia, Ptolemaic Egypt, and the Kingdom of Pergamon exercised full monopolistic control over mining activities, largely to ensure the funding of their armies. By the end of the conquests of Alexander the Great, nearly thirty mints stretching from Macedonia to Babylon produced standard coins. The right to mint coins was shared by central and some local governments, i.e. the autonomous municipal governments of Thessaloniki, Pella, and Amphipolis within the Macedonian commonwealth. The Macedonians were also the first to issue different coins for internal and external circulation.

State revenues were also raised by collecting produce from arable lands, timber from forests, and taxes on imports and exports at harbors. Some mines, groves, agricultural lands, and forests belonging to the Macedonian state were exploited by the Macedonian king, although these were often leased as assets or given as grants to members of the nobility such as the hetairoi and philoi. Tariffs exacted on goods flowing in and out of Macedonian seaports existed from at least the reign of AmyntasIII, and Callistratus of Aphidnae (d.c.350BC) aided PerdiccasIII in doubling the kingdom's annual profits on customs duties from 20 to 40 talents.

After the defeat of Perseus at Pydna in 168BC, the Roman Senate allowed the reopening of iron and copper mines, but forbade the mining of gold and silver by the four newly established autonomous client states that replaced the monarchy in Macedonia. The law may originally have been conceived by the Senate due to the fear that material wealth gained from gold and silver mining operations would allow the Macedonians to fund an armed rebellion. The Romans were perhaps also concerned with stemming inflation caused by an increased money supply from Macedonian silver mining. The Macedonians continued minting silver coins between 167 and 148BC (i.e. just before the establishment of the Roman province of Macedonia), and when the Romans lifted the ban on Macedonian silver mining in 158BC it may simply have reflected the local reality of this illicit practice continuing regardless of the Senate's decree.

Legacy

The reigns of Philip II and Alexander the Great witnessed the demise of Classical Greece and the birth of Hellenistic civilization, following the spread of Greek culture to the Near East during and after Alexander's conquests. Macedonians then migrated to Egypt and parts of Asia, but the intensive colonization of foreign lands sapped the available manpower in Macedonia proper, weakening the kingdom in its fight with other Hellenistic powers and contributing to its downfall and conquest by the Romans. However, the diffusion of Greek culture and language cemented by Alexander's conquests in West Asia and North Africa served as a "precondition" for the later Roman expansion into these territories and entire basis for the Byzantine Empire, according to Errington.

The ethnic Macedonian rulers of the Ptolemaic and Seleucid successor states accepted men from all over the Greek world as their hetairoi companions and did not foster a national identity like the Antigonids. Modern scholarship has focused on how these Hellenistic successor kingdoms were influenced more by their Macedonian origins than Eastern or southern Greek traditions. While Spartan society remained mostly insular and Athens continued placing strict limitations on acquiring citizenship, the cosmopolitan Hellenistic cities of Asia and northeastern Africa bore a greater resemblance to Macedonian cities and contained a mixture of subjects including natives, Greek and Macedonian colonists, and Greek-speaking Hellenized Easterners, many of whom were the product of intermarriage between Greeks and native populations.

The deification of Macedonian monarchs perhaps began with the death of PhilipII, but it was his son Alexander the Great who unambiguously claimed to be a living god. Following his visit to the oracle of Didyma in 334BC that suggested his divinity, Alexander traveled to the Oracle of Zeus Ammon—the Greek equivalent of the Egyptian Amun-Ra—at the Siwa Oasis of the Libyan Desert in 332BC to confirm his divine status. Although the Ptolemaic and Seleucid empires maintained ancestral cults and deified their rulers, kings were not worshiped in the Kingdom of Macedonia. While Zeus Ammon was known to the Greeks prior to Alexander's reign, particularly at the Greek colony of Cyrene, Libya, Alexander was the first Macedonian monarch to patronize Egyptian, Persian, and Babylonian priesthoods and deities, strengthening the fusion of Near Eastern and Greek religious beliefs. After his reign, the cult of Isis gradually spread throughout the Hellenistic and Roman world, while beliefs in the Egyptian god Sarapis were thoroughly Hellenized by the Ptolemaic rulers of Egypt before the spread of his cult to Macedonia and the Aegean region. The German historian Johann Gustav Droysen argued that the conquests of Alexander the Great and creation of the Hellenistic world allowed for the growth and establishment of Christianity in the Roman era.

See also

References

Notes

Citations

Sources
Online

 
 Hamp, Eric; Adams, Douglas (2013). "The Expansion of the Indo-European Languages", Sino-Platonic Papers, vol 239. Accessed 16 January 2017.
 Joseph, Brian D. (2001). ""GREEK, ancient." Ohio State University, Department of Slavic Languages and Literatures. Accessed 16 January 2017.

Print

Further reading

External links

 Ancient Macedonia  at Livius, by Jona Lendering
 Heracles to Alexander The Great: Treasures From The Royal Capital of Macedon, A Hellenic Kingdom in the Age of Democracy, Ashmolean Museum of Art and Archaeology, University of Oxford
 "Macedonia, ancient kingdom", entry from the Encyclopædia Britannica
 "The Rise of Macedonia and the Conquests of Alexander the Great", from the Metropolitan Museum of Art, Timeline of Art History

 
Ancient Macedonia
Former empires in Europe
Hellenistic Macedonia
Macedon, Kingdom
Macedonia Kingdom, Greek
146 BC
States and territories established in the 9th century BC
9th-century BC establishments in Greece
1st-millennium BC disestablishments in Greece
Ancient history
States and territories disestablished in the 2nd century BC
Macedonia
Historical transcontinental empires